is a Japanese professional shogi player ranked 7-dan.

Early life
Chiba was born on February 11, 1979, in Machida, Tokyo. He entered the Japan Shogi Association's apprentice school when he was a junior high school ninth-grade student in 1993 under the guidance of shogi professional  at the rank of 6-kyū. He was promoted to 1-dan in 1995 and obtained full professional status and the rank of 4-dan in October 2000 after winning the 27th 3-dan league (April 2000September 2000).

Personal life
Chiba's wife, Ryōko is a female shogi professional. The couple married in May 2003, and have two daughters.

Promotion history
Chiba's promotion history is as follows:
 6-kyū: 1993
 1-dan: 1995
 4-dan: October 1, 2000
 5-dan: April 1, 2004
 6-dan: September 16, 2010
 7-dan: February 6, 2018

References

External links
ShogiHub: Professional Player Info · Chiba, Sakio

Japanese shogi players
Living people
Professional shogi players
Professional shogi players from Tokyo Metropolis
1979 births
People from Machida, Tokyo